The Dudypta is a river in Krasnoyarsk Krai in Russia, a right tributary of the Pyasina. The Dudypta originates from Lake Makar (Dudypta Lakes) and flows over the central part of the North Siberian Lowland.

References

Rivers of Krasnoyarsk Krai